Fruit Stripe is an artificially and naturally flavored fruit chewing gum. The individual pieces of gum have stripes marked on them, and it is packaged in zebra-striped wrappers, which also act as temporary tattoos.

History
The "Five Flavor Gum" was invented by James Parker and vended first in 1969 by the Beech-Nut company. Farley's & Sathers Candy Company acquired the Fruit Stripe brand-name during 2003 from The Hershey Company. Farley's & Sathers merged with Ferrara Pan during 2012, forming the Ferrara Candy Company, which became a wholly owned subsidiary of Ferrero during 2017.

A new variety was introduced, Fruit Stripes Gummy Candy, in 2022.

Flavors
Two types of five-flavor packs of Fruit Stripe are currently produced:
 Chewing gum: wet 'n wild melon, cherry, lemon, orange, and peach smash
 Bubble gum: cherry, grape, mixed fruit, lemon, and cotton candy

During the late 1970s, there was a chocolate version named Chocolate Stripe.

Mascots
A character known as the Fruit Stripe Gum Man was used to promote the product; he was an anthropomorphic gum pack with limbs and a face. The Stripes Family Animals, which included a zebra, tiger, elephant, and mouse, were also used for advertising and featured in a coloring book and plush toys.

However, the zebra later named Yipes has outlasted the other characters to become Fruit Stripe's sole mascot. The advertising slogan "Yipes! Stripes!" has often been used with this character. Wrappers contain temporary tattoos of Yipes inline skating, skateboarding, playing baseball, hang gliding, playing basketball, bicycling, snowboarding, surfing, playing soccer, playing tennis, and eating grass. In 1988, Yipes was made into a promotional bendy figure. 

Yipes is shown prominently on Fruit Stripe gum packaging. Yipes is often shown as a sports player, playing basketball or soccer on the gum's packaging.

Promotions
In 1996, Fruit Stripe gave five cents from the sale of each Jumbo Pack and Variety Multipack to the World Wildlife Fund, totaling about $100,000, for the preservation of endangered animals and their habitats.

See also
 List of confectionery brands

References

External links
 Ferrara Candy's Fruit Stripe product page

Chewing gum
Products introduced in 1969
Farley's & Sathers Candy Company brands
Ferrara Candy Company brands
Fictional zebras
Brand name confectionery